Chimney Hollow is a valley in Hickman County, Tennessee, in the United States.

Chimney Hollow was named from a geological formation the valley contains resembling a chimney.

References

Landforms of Hickman County, Tennessee
Valleys of Tennessee